The Northern Rocky Mountains ecosystem in the United States is known by ecologists, biologists, and naturalists as one of the last areas of the contiguous United States that is relatively undeveloped enough and large enough to support a functioning ecosystem.  The Northern Rockies Ecosystem Protection Act is designed to protect this ecosystem and the many threatened and endangered species such as grizzly bears (threatened), bull trout (threatened), sockeye salmon (endangered only in Snake River Evolutionary Significant Unit, secure elsewhere), and Canadian lynx (threatened only in lower U.S. 48 states, secure elsewhere), while creating jobs that restore old roads and clear cuts. The Alliance for the Wild Rockies based in Helena, Montana has been campaigning for the legislation for two decades with the help of numerous Congresspersons, celebrities, and grassroots groups such as the Sierra Club and the Wilderness Society.  The legislation has been introduced and discussed in Congress five times since 1993, most recently in November 2011 with 34 co-sponsors by December 2012.

Details of the legislation
The legislation would affect roadless areas in five states, including  in Idaho, 7 million in Montana, 5 million in Wyoming, 750,000 in eastern Oregon and 500,000 in eastern Washington.  The total includes  in Yellowstone, Glacier and Grand Teton national parks. The NREPA does not affect private land.

The legislation will:
 Connect natural, biological corridors,
 Allow hunting, fishing and firewood gathering but no mechanized access to the land

Congressional Action

Carolyn B. Maloney, representative from the 14th district of New York most recently introduced the bill on November 3, 2011, and it had 34 cosponsors as of December 4, 2012. Representative Maloney also introduced the legislation in February 2009, as of December 1, 2009 there were 103 co-sponsoring Congresspersons in the House of Representatives.  The singer Carole King, a resident of Custer County, Idaho, has testified before Congress in 1994, 2007 and 2009 in support of the act.

Opposition to the Legislation
Opponents to the NREPA state that there will be a loss of extraction jobs in the northern Rockies; mining, logging, and oil/gas production as a whole account for many of the jobs in the five affected states.  Economics professor Tom Power, Ph.D. from the University of Montana has found that industries based on extracting resources from the land are more prone to "boom and bust" economic cycles, creating ghost towns, and unstable living conditions, while economies that are based around wilderness areas are more sustainable and have higher than average job growth rates.

Similar Ecosystem Protection Projects
There are other wildland protection projects currently being endeavoured by citizens around the world.  In North America there are four wildlife corridors that have been proposed by the Wildlands Network, each providing a highway, called a "wildway", for migrating creatures to mitigate the effects of climate change: the Pacific Wildway running from Baja to Alaska, Boreal Wildway running west–east from Alaska, through Canada, to the northeastern shores of North America, the Eastern Wildway running from Everglades in Florida to the Arctic, and the Western Wildway also called the "spine of the continent" runs from southern Mexico along the Rocky Mountains up into the Arctic. The Yellowstone to Yukon Conservation Initiative (also known as Y2Y) is a bi-national NGO that promotes the conservation of habitats and wildlife movement ability from the Greater Yellowstone Ecosystem to the Arctic Circle.

See also
Conservation Biology
Ecosystem
Bioregion
Biodiversity

References

Further reading
 McMillion, Scott. "U.S. House subcommittee to hear wilderness bill" Bozeman Daily Chronicle; Monday, October 8, 2007.
 Staff. "Jobs for the environment" High Country News; September 4, 1995.
 Larmer, Paul. "Sierra Club to back big wildlands bill" High Country News; December 27, 1993.
 Richards, Paul. "This wilderness bill is a homespun vision for the West" High Country News; June 4, 2009.
 Larmer, Paul. "Regional wilderness bill gets a hearing" High Country News; May 2, 1994.
 Gilman, Sarah. "Wildlife wars" High Country News; October 13, 2008.
 Frey, David. "Massive Wilderness Bill Inches Forward—13 Years Later" New West; October 11, 2007.
 Staff. "Hearing finally set on wilderness bill" Queen City News (Helena, Montana). Thursday, October 11, 2007.
 Staff. ‘The Northern Rockies Ecosystem Protection Act’: Bill would close  of land in Wyoming, four other states Uinta County Herald (Uinta, Utah); Friday, May 8, 2009.
 Crane, Stephen. "Lummis, Bousman rip wilderness bill" Pinedale Roundup (Pinedale, WY); Thursday, May 7, 2009.
 Stahl, Greg. "Congressional committee to review wilderness bill: NREPA would designate 23 million acres across 5 states" Idaho Mountain Express; Wednesday, October 10, 2007.
 Rasker, R., B. Alexander, J. van den Noort, R. Carter. 2004. Public Lands Conservation and Economic Well-Being. Sonoran Institute. Bozeman, Montana.
 Rasker, R., B. Alexander, J. van den Noort, R. Carter. 2004. Prosperity in the 21st Century West. Sonoran Institute. Bozeman, Montana.
 Salwasser, H., Morton S. and Rasker, R. 1998. The Role of Wildlands in Sustaining Communities and Economies and Vice Versa. Personal, Societal, and Ecological Values of Wilderness Sixth World Congress Proceeding on Research, Management, and Allocation. Volume !. USDA Forest Service. Rocky Mountain Research Station. Proceedings RMRS P-4. October.
 Garrity, Michael T. Economic Analysis of the Northern Rockies Ecosystem Protection Act Alliance for the Wild Rockies.

External links
 Alliance for the Wild Rockies online brochure for NREPA

Nature conservation in the United States
Ecology of the Rocky Mountains
Proposed legislation of the 107th United States Congress
Proposed legislation of the 108th United States Congress
Proposed legislation of the 110th United States Congress
Proposed legislation of the 111th United States Congress
Proposed legislation of the 112th United States Congress
Proposed legislation of the 113th United States Congress
Proposed legislation of the 114th United States Congress
Proposed legislation of the 115th United States Congress
Proposed legislation of the 116th United States Congress
Proposed legislation of the 117th United States Congress
United States proposed federal environmental legislation